Heather Greenwood Harper (born c. 1958) is an American former freestyle swimmer. She won one gold and three silver medals at the world championships in 1973 and 1975, and set a world record over 400 m in 1974.

In 1975 Greenwood enrolled to the University of Southern California, following her brother Mark, who was also a competitive swimmer. She retired from competitions after failing to qualify for the 1976 Summer Olympics.

See also
 List of World Aquatics Championships medalists in swimming (women)
 World record progression 400 metres freestyle

References

1958 births
Living people
American female freestyle swimmers
World record setters in swimming
World Aquatics Championships medalists in swimming
21st-century American women